Dr. Mohamed Mashally (1944 – 28 July 2020), or the "doctor of poor people",  was an Egyptian doctor known for treating poor patients at a very low cost. Mashally’s career as a doctor spanned over 50 years.

Early life 
Mashally was born in the village of Dhahr El Temsah in Beheira Governorate in northern Egypt. His father was a teacher. The family subsequently moved to Tanta in Gharbia Governorate, and Mashally studied at Qasr Al-Eini Faculty of Medicine, before specialising in internal medicine, paediatrics, and infectious diseases.

In 1975, Mashally opened a clinic in Gharbia for which he charged patients only £E 5 for medical examinations. The clinic, which remained open for many years, only increased its charges to £E 10, with Mashally frequently offering examinations free of charge for poor patients.

Death 
Mohamed Mashally died on 28 July 2020 in Tanta, Gharbia governorate and was buried in his native Governorate of Beheira.

References 

 
1944 births
2020 deaths
People from Beheira Governorate